Al Nahda is a Saudi football club from the city of Dammam, Eastern province. Established in 1949, they currently play in the Saudi First Division.

In the 2007–2008 season, under the lead of the Croatian coach Dragan Talajić, Al Nahda played the finals of the Prince Faisal Cup, being the first team from the Saudi Second League to play in the final.

Honours
Saudi First Division
Winners (3): 1976–77, 1990–91, 1992–93
Runners-up (1): 2012–13
Saudi Second Division
Winners (2): 1997–98, 2010–11
Runners-up (1): 2005–06
Prince Faisal bin Fahd Cup for Division 1 and 2 Teams
Winners (2): 1992–93, 1995–96
Runners-up (1): 2007–08

Current squad 
As of Saudi Second Division:

Managers
 Dragan Talajić (2007–09)
 Bahaa Aldeen Al-Qebisi (2011)
 Jalel Kadri (2012–13)
 Ilie Balaci (June 4, 2013 – Sept 24, 2013)
 Jalal Qaderi (2013–14)
 Sameer Hilal (2014–2016)
 Mladen Frančić (2016)

References

External links
Goalzz.com Profile
Kooora.com Profile 
Slstat.com 2013–14 season Profile
Official club website

Nahda
Nahda
Nahda
Football clubs in Eastern Province, Saudi Arabia
Nahda